United States v. Stanley, 483 U.S. 669 (1987), was a United States Supreme Court case in which the Court held that a serviceman could not file a tort action against the federal government even though the government secretly administered doses of LSD to him as part of an experimental program, because his injuries were found by the lower court to be service-related.

Background 
In February 1958, James B. Stanley, a master sergeant in the Army stationed at Fort Knox, Kentucky, volunteered for a chemical warfare testing program. Stanley was administered lysergic acid diethylamide (LSD) in a US Army plan to test the effects of the drug on human subjects. Stanley claimed he was unknowingly given the drug.

Stanley claimed that as a result of the LSD exposure, he suffered from hallucinations, periods of incoherence, and memory loss due to his unawareness of having taken the drug. He suffered severe personality changes that led to his discharge and the dissolution of his marriage.

Stanley filed a lawsuit under the Federal Tort Claims Act (FTCA) alleging negligence in the administration, supervision, and subsequent monitoring of the experimental program.

The United States Court of Appeals for the Eleventh Circuit held that the serviceman could assert his claims under the FTCA and refused to dismiss the serviceman's Bivens claims.

Opinion of the Court 
After granting certiorari, the Supreme Court held that the circuit court had no jurisdiction to give orders to dismiss FTCA claims. The Supreme Court also held there was no Bivens claim for the serviceman's injuries because the lower court ruled the injuries occurred during Stanley's military service.

Aftermath 
In 1994 Congress passed a private claims bill to redress the case. In 1996 an arbitration panel awarded Stanley $400,577 (the maximum amount allowed under the bill) after a 2-1 vote.

References

External links 

 Tom Bowman, Former sergeant seeks compensation for LSD testing at Edgewood Arsenal, July 11, 1991, Baltimore Sun
 Oral history interview with James Stanley

United States Constitution Article Three case law
United States Supreme Court cases
1987 in United States case law
Implied constitutional cause of action case law
United States federal sovereign immunity case law
United States Supreme Court cases of the Rehnquist Court